"Las-o…" (English: "Let her…") is a song by Romanian rapper Vescan featuring Florin Ristei. The song's music was written by Mahia Beldo and the lyrics were written by Vescan. "Las-o…" is a Hip-Hop-Rap song where the Rap part is done by Vescan, being accompanied by Ristei who sings the pop-oriented chorus. The lyrics are written as a monologue of a male who advises his friend to let go of his girlfriend, after she has cheated on him. The song experienced commercial success, peaking at number one in the Romanian charts and the XsessionMUSICVLOG music video surpassing 43 million views on YouTube (as of ).

The song peaked number 1 in both the weekly Romanian Radio and TV Airplay charts and won the Media Music Award for Best Summer Hit of 2016.

Music videos and promotion
Two accompanying music videos for "Las-o…" were made. It is dubbed as the Xsession version and it features Vescan, Ristei and the band all playing the song. It illustrates the meaning and the lyrics of the song with Vescan playing the cheated boyfriend.

Vescan and Ristei performed the track live in Romania: on Radio ZU, on Radio 21, at the Forza ZU Festival, on ProFM LIVE Session and at the X Factor Romania.

Credits and personnel 
Credits adapted from YouTube.

Technical and songwriting credits
 Mahia Beldo – composer, producer, additional voices, mixing
 Daniel Leonard Vescan (Vescan) – lyricist
 Adi Colceru – mastering
 Alin Ilies – guitarist
 Bogdan Chiculita – violinist

Visual credits
 Claudiu Stan – director
 Iulia Dinu, Andrei – actors

Charts

See also 
 List of Media Forest most-broadcast songs of the 2010s in Romania

References 

2016 songs
2016 singles
Number-one singles in Romania